Nitensidine D is a toxic alkaloid natural product that was isolated from the leaves of the South American legume Pterogyne nitens. It is also hypothesized to be a possible intermediate in the still unknown, seemingly monoterpene based, terrestrial biosynthetic pathway for tetrodotoxin.

See also
 Galegine

References

Guanidine alkaloids
Plant toxins